Leonardo Tortomasi (born 21 January 1994) is an Italian former cyclist, who competed as a professional from 2021 to 2021 for UCI ProTeam .

Major results
2019
 2nd Gran Premio San Giuseppe

References

External links

1994 births
Living people
Italian male cyclists
People from Partinico
Sportspeople from the Province of Palermo
Cyclists from Sicily